The Scratch Orchestra was an experimental musical ensemble founded in the spring of 1969 by Cornelius Cardew, Michael Parsons and Howard Skempton.

In the draft constitution published in the Musical Times of June 1969, Cardew defines a scratch orchestra as: "a large number of enthusiasts pooling their resources (not primarily material resources) and assembling for action (music-making, performance, edification)". The Orchestra reflected Cardew's musical philosophy at that time. This meant that anyone could join, graphic scores were used (rather than traditional sheet music), and there was an emphasis on improvisation. The Scratch Orchestra arose from Cardew's 'Experimental Music' class at Morley College, London, which served as a venue for extra rehearsals for Scratch Orchestra concerts, but Scratch Orchestra rehearsals were also held separately. New Zealand artist/musician Philip Dadson was amongst those at Morley College who were in the foundation group for the Scratch Orchestra and, after returning to New Zealand, established a NZ Scratch Orchestra in 1970, which evolved into the group From Scratch in 1974.

The first meeting of the Scratch Orchestra was at St Katharine Docks, 1 July 1969.  It was announced by means of a "Draft Constitution", published in The Musical Times in June 1969.  The Draft Constitution set out categories of musical activity: Improvisation Rites, Popular Classics, Compositions, and Research Projects.  Cardew also proposed that the responsibility of programming of concerts be assigned in reverse seniority, so that the first concert, on 1 November 1969 at Hampstead Town Hall, was designed by Christopher Hobbs, an eighteen-year-old student of Cardew's at the Royal Academy of Music. Original members included Carole Finer.

Despite the emphasis on free improvisation, the varying experience of the members, and the "do your own thing" free aesthetic of the time, the Scratch Orchestra was a disciplined ensemble. Eventually the strains of Cardew's "reverse seniority", tensions between musically-trained and non-musically-trained members, and an increasing interest in political aesthetics led to a gradual change in the activities, and then the outlook of the ensemble. It was effectively inoperative by 1974.

Further reading
 Edwin Prévost, ed.; introduction by Michael Parsons, Cornelius Cardew: A Reader (Harlow, Essex: Copula, 2006). . (A collection of Cornelius Cardew's published writings together with commentaries and responses from Richard Barrett, Christopher Fox, Brian Dennis, Anton Lukoszevieze, Michael Nyman, Eddie Prévost, David Ryan, Howard Skempton, Dave Smith, John Tilbury and Christian Wolff.)
 Cornelius Cardew, ed. Scratch Music (Cambridge, Mass.: MIT Press). . (Scratch Orchestra draft constitution, notes, scores, catalogue, and 1001 Activities.)
 Cornelius Cardew, "Stockhausen Serves Imperialism", and Other Articles: with Commentary and Notes (London: Latimer New Dimensions, 1974) (download PDF)
 Michael Parsons, ed. 25 Years from Scratch: The Scratch Orchestra (London: London Musicians' Collective, 1994) (download PDF)
 Stefan Szczelkun ed. Improvisation Rites: from John Cage's 'Song Books' to the Scratch Orchestra's 'Nature Study Notes'. Collective practices 2011 – 2017 (Routine Art Co. 2017) 
 John Tilbury, Cornelius Cardew (1936–1981): A Life Unfinished (Essex: Copula, 2008)
 Katie Macfarlane, Rob Stone, Grant Watson, eds., Play for Today: Cornelius Cardew (London: Drawing Room; Antwerp: Museum van Hedendaagse Kunst Antwerpen (M HKA), 2009)

References

External links
Nature Study Notes Carole Finer and Stefan Szczelkun read and discuss the verbal scores that kicked off the Scratch Orchestra in 1969.
 Nature Study Notes texts at International Improvised Music Archive.
 The Scratch Orchestra

Free improvisation ensembles
British experimental musical groups
Musical groups established in 1969